The following is a list of college football venues in Kansas.  Included on this list are past and present locations that served as the home field for college football programs in the state of Kansas.  The list is organized by current affiliation. Kansas does not have any NCAA Division I FCS or NCAA Division III schools.

List of college football venues in Kansas

NCAA Division I FBS
 Bill Snyder Family Football Stadium - (Kansas State)
 David Booth Kansas Memorial Stadium - (Kansas)

NCAA Division II
 Carnie Smith Stadium - (Pittsburg State)
 Francis G. Welch Stadium - (Emporia State)
 Lewis Field Stadium - (Fort Hays State)
 Yager Stadium at Moore Bowl - (Washburn)

NAIA
 Adair-Austin Stadium - (Friends)
 Larry Wilcox Stadium - (Benedictine)
 Lindstrom Field - (Bethany)
 Liston Stadium - (Baker)
 Thresher Stadium - (Bethel)
 Gene Bissell Field - (Kansas Wesleyan)
 Salina Stadium - (?? - 2015)
 McPherson Stadium - (McPherson)
 Peoples Bank Field - (Ottawa)
 Pioneer Stadium - (MidAmerica Nazarene)
 Saint Mary Field - (Saint Mary)
 Joel Wiens Stadium - (Tabor)
 Smisor Stadium - (Sterling)
 Richard L. Jantz Stadium - (Southwestern)

Defunct programs
 Cessna Stadium - Wichita State, program discontinued in 1986, scheduled for demolition on a to be determined date in 2020.
 Haskell Memorial Stadium - Haskell, program discontinued in 2015 due to lack of funds

Old stadiums
 Memorial Stadium – Kansas State, used from 1922 to 1967, no longer used for football

Demolished stadiums
 Ahearn Field – Kansas State, used from 1911 to 1921, first on-campus athletic field for the school, was on the same site as Memorial Stadium
 Bovaird Stadium - College of Emporia, used until the college closed
 McCook Field – Kansas, used from 1892 until it was demolished in 1920. The field is now the site of the current football stadium.

Image gallery

References